Amy Paulin (born November 29, 1955) was elected to the New York State Assembly in November 2000. She represents the 88th Assembly District. Paulin chairs the Assembly Committee on Corporations, Authorities and Commissions, and serves on the Committees on Rules, Education, and Health. She previously chaired the Assembly Committee on Energy and before that chaired the Committee on Libraries and Education Technology and the Task Force on People with Disabilities.

In 2021, Governor Andrew Cuomo signed Assemblywoman Paulin's bill into law.  The law repeals the ban on paid gestational surrogacy.  She first introduced the bill in 2012.

Paulin resides in Scarsdale with her husband, Ira Schuman. They have three children; Beth, Sarah, and Joseph.

References

External links
 New York State Assembly profile

Place of birth missing (living people)
1955 births
Living people
21st-century American women politicians
Democratic Party members of the New York State Assembly
People from Scarsdale, New York
Politicians from Westchester County, New York
Women state legislators in New York (state)
21st-century American politicians